Karuthukalai Pathivu Sei is a 2019 Indian Tamil-language social thriller film directed by Rahul Paramahamsa. The film stars Upasana RC in the lead role. The theme of the film is based on the challenges and issues confronted by women in the society due to social media. Principal photography of the film commenced in late 2018. The film was released on 13 December 2019 and opened to negative reviews.

Synopsis 
A girl who is influenced by social media, struggles and falls into love trap which was set by malicious men. She then realizes her blunder and attempts to escape from the tragedy.

Cast 
 SSR Aryan
 Upasana RC as Bharathi
TK Srinivasan

Production 
The film was announced by director Rahul Paramahamsa which was his third directorial venture after 2016 film Jithan 2 & 2017 film 1am. The filmmakers roped in SSR Aryan as the male lead and Upasana RC in female lead which marked her third film after Traffic Ramasamy and Brahma.com. The film was predominantly shot and set in Chennai and the filming completed within 25 days. The first look poster of the film was unveiled in November 2019 and the official trailer was unveiled on 25 November 2019.

Reception 
The Times of India gave the film a rating of one-and-half out of five stars and stated that "The movie becomes preachy after a point and turns out to be another reason why we find it difficult to sit through the film. Upasana’s performance as the revenge-seeking rape victim is decent, though".

References

External links 
 

2010s Tamil-language films
2019 crime thriller films
Indian crime drama films
Indian crime thriller films
Indian thriller drama films
2019 crime drama films
2019 thriller drama films
Films shot in Chennai
2019 films